Story & Pictures Media is a South Korean TV series production company, founded in 2017 by former AStory producer Hwang Jee-woo. As of 2021, it is a subsidiary of Kakao Entertainment.

Managed people
Joo Hwa-mi (co-managed by CAMP ENT)
Jung Hyun-jung
Jung Yoon-jung
Kang Eun-kyung (co-managed by CAMP ENT)
Kim Bo-hyun
Jane "Je In" Kim (co-managed by CAMP ENT)
Kim Min-seo

Lee Sung-eun
Ma Jin-won

Works

References

External links
 

Television production companies of South Korea
Companies based in Seoul
Mass media companies established in 2017
Kakao subsidiaries
Kakao M
South Korean companies established in 2017